The following is a list of football stadiums in the Netherlands, ordered by capacity. Stadiums in bold are part of the 2022–23 Eredivisie. The minimum required capacity is 4,000. The first table shows the stadiums used by professional football clubs.

Stadiums used by professional football clubs

Other stadiums

See also
List of football clubs in the Netherlands
List of European stadiums by capacity
List of association football stadiums by capacity

 
Netherlands
Stadiums
Football stadiums